Michael "Mike" Funk (born August 15, 1986 in Abbotsford, British Columbia) is a retired professional ice hockey defenceman who played in the National Hockey League (NHL) with the Buffalo Sabres.  He was drafted by the Sabres in the second round, 43rd overall, of the 2004 NHL Entry Draft.

Playing career
Funk spent his junior hockey career with the Portland Winter Hawks of the Western Hockey League where he compiled 121 points and 312 penalty minutes in four seasons.  Funk signed his first professional contract in June 2006 with the Buffalo Sabres, and made his NHL debut with the team on November 18 of the 2006–07 season. He played in five NHL games with the Sabres in 2006–07, recording two assists.

On July 6, 2009, he was signed by the Vancouver Canucks and was playing with their American Hockey League affiliate, the Manitoba Moose.  Funk received a concussion and was forced into retirement after a hit to the head during practice from teammate Patrick Kaleta. This was also his fourth concussion in 14 months, and he was advised by doctors to stop playing hockey.

Career statistics

Regular season and playoffs

International

References

External links

1986 births
Living people
Buffalo Sabres draft picks
Buffalo Sabres players
Canadian ice hockey defencemen
Ice hockey people from British Columbia
Manitoba Moose players
Sportspeople from Abbotsford, British Columbia
Portland Pirates players
Portland Winterhawks players
Rochester Americans players